The 1900–01 season is the 27th season of competitive football by Rangers.

Overview
Rangers played a total of 21 competitive matches during the 1900–01 season. The club finished top of the Scottish League Division One, having won 17 of their 20 league matches (including a 100% home record).

The second placed side, Celtic, who had finished a whole six points behind Rangers did knock Wilton's team out of the Scottish Cup after a 1-0 away defeat.

Results
All results are written with Rangers' score first.

Scottish League Division One

Scottish Cup

Appearances

See also
 1900–01 in Scottish football
 1900–01 Scottish Cup

Rangers F.C. seasons
ran
Scottish football championship-winning seasons